North Branch may refer to:

Australia
 North Branch, Queensland (Southern Downs Region), a locality
 North Branch, Queensland (Toowoomba Region), a locality

United States

Inhabited places
 North Branch, Kansas
 North Branch, Maryland
 North Branch, Michigan
 North Branch, Minnesota
 North Branch, New Jersey
 North Branch (NJT station), a New Jersey Transit railroad station
 North Branch, New York
 North Branch, Wisconsin, an unincorporated community

Other U.S. topics
 North Branch (New York)
 North Branch River, a river in New Hampshire
 North Branch Basket Creek, a creek in New York
 North Branch Trail, a bicycle trail in Cook County, Illinois

Canada 
 North Branch, Newfoundland and Labrador
 North Branch, Glengarry County, Ontario
 North Branch, Rainy River District, Ontario
 North Branch Formation, a geologic formation in Yukon

See also
 
 Branch (disambiguation)
 East Branch (disambiguation)
 North Branch Township (disambiguation)
 South Branch (disambiguation)
 West Branch (disambiguation)
 North River (disambiguation)